Stifelsen Manifest is a Norwegian socialist think-tank.

See also
 Civita
 LibLab

Political and economic think tanks based in Europe
Socialist think tanks